Cat the Cat is a book series for very early readers by award-winning children's author and illustrator, Mo Willems.  The series debuted in February 2010 with the publication of two books, with additional books slated to follow soon thereafter.  

Prior to the first book's release, the Cat the Cat series garnered advance reviews including a starred review in Publishers Weekly, which said, "Willems provides just enough humor and surprise to entertain youngest audiences...Cat could become another favorite; her personality sparkles in expansive gestures and gleeful interactions." The series also has been mentioned in School Library Journal.

Books
 Cat the Cat, Who Is That? (Feb 2010)
 Let's Say Hi to Friends Who Fly (Feb 2010)
 What's Your Sound, Hound the Hound? (Apr 2010)
 Time to Sleep, Sheep the Sheep! (Jun 2010)

Board Book Adaptations for the Very Youngest Readers
 Who Is That, Cat the Cat? (Apr 2014)
 Who Flies, Cat the Cat? (Apr 2014)
 Who Says That, Cat the Cat? (Aug 2014)
 Who Sleeps, Cat the Cat? (Aug 2014)

Trivia
Pigeon, another series and character by Mo Willems, is hidden in each Cat the Cat book.

References

External links
Cat the Cat's website
Mo Willems' website
Mo Willems' blog

Children's fiction books
Series of children's books
2010s children's books